Highway 45 (AR 45, Ark. 45, or Hwy. 45) is a designation for three state highways in northwest Arkansas. The southern segment of  runs from Highway 96 north across US Route 71 (US 71) to Interstate 540/US 71 (I-540/US 71) in Fort Smith. Another segment of  runs Highway 59 at Dutch Mills to US 62 in rural Washington County. A third route of  runs from U.S. Route 71B (US 71B) in Fayetteville to Highway 12 near Clifty.

Route description

Hartford to Fort Smith
The route begins at Highway 96 in Hartford and runs north to form a concurrency with Highway 252 through Midland. Further north, the route has an Officially designated exception of  through downtown Hackett. Slightly north of this exception, Highway 45 runs on the Hackett Creek Bridge and continues north to Bonanza. The route intersects Highway 253 and curves east to form a concurrency with US 71. The highway splits from US 71 to the north and, entering Fort Smith and intersecting Highway 255 before terminating at I-540/US 71.

Dutch Mills to Lincoln
Highway 45 begins at Highway 59 at the incorporated community of Dutch Mills, and runs east past the Bethlehem Cemetery and Twin Bridges Historic District, both on the National Register of Historic Places. The route continues northeast through Clyde before passing the Pyeatte Mill Site and entering the historic community of Canehill. Continuing north, the highway meets US 62 east of Lincoln, where it terminates.

Fayetteville to Clifty
The third routing of Highway 45 begins at US 71B and runs west as Lafayette Street through Fayetteville. Highway 45 runs through the Washington-Willow Historic District before a sharp left turn onto Mission Boulevard. The highway continues northeast until intersecting Highway 265 and exiting Fayetteville heading east. Passing the Son's Chapel and entering Goshen, the highway continues east through rural Washington County until entering Madison County shortly after a junction with Highway 303. Highway 45 has a junction with Highway 295 before forming a concurrency with  US 412 Business north through Hindsville. The route continues north, with US 412B terminating at a junction with US 412 and Highway 45 terminating at Highway 12 near Clifty.

History
Arkansas Highway 45 was one of the original 1926 state highways. The route ran north from Oklahoma west of Hartford, Arkansas to Clifty. The middle segment was replaced by Arkansas Highway 59 between Van Buren and Dutch Mills, and the route remains fragmented today.

Major intersections

See also

 List of state highways in Arkansas

References

External links

045
Transportation in Washington County, Arkansas
Transportation in Madison County, Arkansas
Transportation in Sebastian County, Arkansas